The 2000–01 Liga Nacional de Fútbol Femenino was the 13th season of the Spanish women's football first division. Levante won its second title.

Competition format
The 56 teams were divided into four groups of 14 teams each one. The four group winners would qualify to the Final Four for deciding the league champion.

The two first teams of each group and the best third placed teams would qualify for the Copa de la Reina de Fútbol.

Group 1

Group 2

Group 3

Group 4

Final four
The Final Four was played on 19 and 21 May 2001.

References

2000-01
Spa
1
women